David Cormican is President and partner at Don Carmody Television. DCTV projects include the International Emmy Award nominated Netflix and NHK mini-series Tokyo Trial, the Rogers-Netflix original series Between, which debuted in 2015 and the Emmy Award nominated The Secret Life of Marilyn Monroe for Lifetime.

Recently selected by The Hollywood Reporter as one of the Next Generation Canada: Class of 2014, Cormican was also recognized by Playback as one of the Top 10 to Watch in 2012, Cormican is also a recipient of the National Screen Institute’s Producer Drama Prize and most recently delivered the keynote convocation address when he was awarded by MacEwan University with their highest honour, as their 2016 Distinguished Alumnus for his contribution to the arts, business and community. Filmmaking accomplishments include the Christian Slater thriller Stranded, directed by Academy Award® winner Roger Christian, treaty co-production The Tall Man (Jessica Biel), directed by Pascal Laugier (Martyrs) for SND and released theatrically by Image in the USA, 13 Eerie for eOne, and Faces in the Crowd (Milla Jovovich) for Voltage Films. Since founding the Canadian Short Screenplay Competition (CSSC) in 2008, the CSSC and Cormican have produced five of the winning short film scripts, including Rusted Pyre, which premiered at the 2011 Festival de Cannes as part of Telefilm’s "Not Short On Talent" programme and Will, which won the Golden Sheaf for Best Drama as part of the 2013 Yorkton Film Festival.

Cormican is a Trans-Atlantic Partners (TAP) Producer, member of both the European Film Academy and the Academy of Canadian Cinema & Television, and is a two time elected board member for the Canadian Media Producers Association (CMPA).  He maintains dual-citizenship with both Canada and Ireland.

Filmography

Northern Rescue (TV series) (2019)
Tulipani, Love, Honour and a Bicycle (2017)
ShadowHunters (TV series) (2016)
Tokyo Trial (miniseries) (2016)
Between (TV series) (2015)
The Secret Life of Marilyn Monroe (miniseries) (2015)
Stranded (2013)
13 Eerie (2013)
The Tall Man (2012)
Faces in the Crowd (2011)
Lullaby For Pi (2010)

References

External links

https://www.hollywoodreporter.com/news/nhk-pacts-canadian-dutch-producers-705843
https://variety.com/2013/film/global/cormican-nabs-jane-austen-marriage-manual-rights-exclusive-1200328109/

1981 births
Film producers from Alberta
Canadian television producers
Living people